Louisea is a genus of freshwater crab in the family Potamonautidae, containing two species, Louisea balssi and Louisea edeaensis. Both species are endemic to Cameroon and listed as endangered species on the IUCN Red List.

L. edeaensis is known from only three specimens, which were collected in 1910 from two locations in Edéa and Yabassi, while L. balssi is only known from four specimens collected in the Bamenda highlands, and has not been seen alive since 1909.

References

Potamoidea
Freshwater crustaceans of Africa
Crustacean genera
Taxonomy articles created by Polbot